Ashmead may refer to:
People
Ann Wheeler Harnwell Ashmead (born 1929), American archaeologist
Ashmead Nedd (born 2001), West Indian cricketer
Charles Ashmead Schaeffer (1843–1898), seventh President of the University of Iowa
Elizabeth Fry Ashmead Schaeffer (1812–1892), leader of many ministries of the Lutheran Church in Philadelphia
Ellis Ashmead-Bartlett (1881–1931), British war correspondent during the First World War
Ellis Ashmead-Bartlett (politician) (1849–1902), American born British Conservative politician
Isaac Ashmead (1790–1870), printer in Philadelphia, Pennsylvania
John Ashmead (1917–1992), American novelist
Larry Ashmead (1932–2010), American book editor
William Ashmead Courtenay (1831–1908), mayor of Charleston, South Carolina
William Harris Ashmead (1855–1908), American entomologist 
William Burdett-Coutts (1851–1921), British Conservative politician (born William Lehman Ashmead-Bartlett)

Other uses
Ashmead College, former name of a system of for-profit colleges located in the Pacific Northwest region of the United States
Ashmead Combined School on Walton Court housing estate in Aylesbury, Buckinghamshire
Ashmead Village, Pennsylvania, an unincorporated community in Pennsylvania, United States
Ashmead's Kernel, a triploid cultivar of apple
DeArmond, Ashmead & Bickley, an early-20th-century architecture and landscape architecture firm based in Philadelphia, Pennsylvania
George A. Ferris and Son (redirect from George Ashmead Ferris), was an architectural firm in Reno, Nevada

See also